As of 2011, most Armenians in Armenia are Christians (97%) and are members of the Armenian Apostolic Church, which is one of the oldest Christian churches. It was founded in the 1st century AD, and in 301 AD became the first branch of Christianity to become a state religion.

According to Pew Research publication in December 2018 Armenia is the 2nd most religious country among 34 European nations with 80% of respondents saying they believe in God with absolute certainty.

In the 21st century, the largest minority Christian churches in the country are composed of new converts to Protestant and non-trinitarian Christianity, a combined total up to 38,989 persons (1.3%). Due to the country's ethnic homogeneity, non-Christian religions such as Yazidism and Islam have only a few adherents.

Religious demography

Approximately 98.1% of the country's population is ethnic Armenian. Armenians have a very strong cultural connection to the Armenian Apostolic Church. About 97% of citizens belong to the Armenian Apostolic Church, an Eastern Christian denomination in communion with the other Oriental Orthodox churches. The Armenian Apostolic Church has its spiritual center at the Etchmiadzin Cathedral. The head of the church is Catholicos Karekin II.

According to the Census of 2011, the composition of people identifying with religions in Armenia is the following: Christianity 2,862,366 (99%), of whom 2,797,187 are Armenian Apostolic (97%); 29,280 Evangelical; 13,996  Catholics—both Armenian Catholic Church and Latin Church—8,695 Jehovah's Witness; 7,587 Eastern Orthodox (Russian, Ukrainian, Georgian, Greek); 2,874 Molokan (non-Orthodox Russians); 1,733 Assyrian Church of the East (Nestorian); 733 Protestant; 241 Church of Jesus Christ of Latter-day Saints; 23,374 Yazidi (0.8%); 5,146 Pagan (0.2%); 812 Muslim; 5,299 people of other religions (0.2%); 121,587 no response (4.0%).

Yazidis are concentrated primarily in agricultural areas around Mount Aragats, northwest of the capital Yerevan. They live in 19 villages in the Aragatsotn Province, two villages in the Armavir Province, and one village in the Ararat Province.

Armenian Catholics live mainly in the northern region, in seven villages in the Shirak Province and six villages in the Lori Province.

Molokans live in 10 villages in the Lori Province, two villages in the Shirak Province, and two villages in the Gegharkunik Province.

Most Jews, Mormons, followers of the Baháʼí Faith, Eastern Orthodox Christians, and Latin Catholic Christians reside in the capital Yerevan, which has attracted a greater variety of peoples. Yerevan also has a small community of Muslims, including ethnic Kurds, Iranians, and temporary residents from the Middle East. Foreign missionary groups are active in the country.

Freedom of religion

The Constitution as amended in 2005 provides for freedom of religion and the right to practice, choose, or change religious belief. It recognizes "the exclusive mission of the Armenian Church as a national church in the spiritual life, development of the national culture, and preservation of the national identity of the people of Armenia." The law places some restrictions on the religious freedom of religious groups other than the Armenian Church. The Law on Freedom of Conscience establishes the separation of church and state but it grants the Armenian Church official status as the national church.

Traditional Armenian religions

Armenian Apostolic Church

According to tradition, Christianity was first introduced to this area by the apostles Bartholomew and Thaddeus in the 1st century AD. Armenia became the first country to establish Christianity as its state religion when, in an event traditionally dated to 301 AD, St. Gregory the Illuminator convinced Tiridates III, the king of Armenia, to convert to Christianity. Before this, the dominant religion was Armenian paganism, under the theological influence of Zoroastrianism.

The Armenian Apostolic Church is the national church of the Armenian people. Part of Oriental Orthodoxy, it is one of the most ancient Christian institutions. And  is "seen by many as the custodian of Armenian national identity". "Beyond its role as a religious institution, the Apostolic Church has traditionally been seen as the foundational core in the development of the Armenian national identity as God's uniquely chosen people."

Hetanism

Hetanism (Հեթանոսություն, Hetanosutyun) is a neo-pagan movement in Armenia. Adherents call themselves "Hetans" (Hetanos հեթանոս, the Old Armenian biblical term loaned from Greek ἐθνικός "gentile"). The movement traces its origins back to the work of the early-20th-century political philosopher and revolutionary Garegin Nzhdeh and his doctrine of tseghakron (rejuvenation through national religion). In 1991, it was institutionalized by the Armenologist Slak Kakosyan into the "Order of the Children of Ari" (Arordineri Ukht). The movement is strongly associated to Armenian nationalism. It finds some support from nationalist political parties of Armenia, particularly the Republican Party of Armenia and the Union of Armenian Aryans.

Other Christians and other religions

Other Christian denominations

Catholic Church 

The Catholic Church in Armenia is divided between Latin Church parishes (subject to the Apostolic Administration of the Caucasus) and the Armenian Catholic Church's parishes. The 2011 census counted 13,996 Catholics.

Protestantism 

Since the end of the Soviet Union, American Protestant missionaries have been proselytising in the country. The 2011 census counted 29,280 Evangelicals (1% of the population) and 773 mainline Protestants.

Eastern Orthodoxy

According to the Census of 2011, there are 7,587 adherents of Eastern Orthodoxy in Armenia, mainly Russians, Ukrainians, Georgians and Greeks. Russian Orthodox community is centered around Church of the Intercession of the Holy Mother of God in Yerevan, consecrated in 1912.

Molokans 
According to the Census of 2011, there are 2,874 Molokans in Armenia.

Nestorianism 
According to the Census of 2011, there are 1,733 Nestorians in Armenia.

Restorationism
The Jehovah's Witnesses have estimated their membership at 11,500; the 2011 census found 8,695.

The Church of Jesus Christ of Latter-day Saints claims approximately 3,000 adherents in Armenia at the end of 2011; the 2011 census found 241.

Yazidism

About 1% of Armenia's population (23,374 as per the 2011 census), mostly ethnic Yazidis, an ethno-religious group living in the western part of the country, follow Yazidism, one of the Yazdan religions. Many Yazidis came to Armenia and Georgia during the 19th and early 20th centuries to escape religious persecution. Relations between Yazidis and Armenians are strong.  The world's largest Yazidi temple is constructed in the small village of Aknalich.

Judaism 

Currently there are an estimated 750 Jews in the country, a remnant of a once larger community.  Most left Armenia for Israel after the collapse of the Soviet Union in pursuit of better living standards.  Still, despite the small numbers, high intermarriage rate and relative isolation, a lot of enthusiasm exists to help the community meet its needs.

Islam 

Azerbaijanis and Kurds living in Armenia traditionally practised Islam, but most Azerbaijanis, who were the largest minority in the country, fled during the First Nagorno-Karabakh War. In 2009, the Pew Research Center estimated that less than 0.1% of the population, or about 1,000 people, were Muslims.

The 18th century Blue Mosque is open for Friday prayers.

Throughout history, Armenians did not convert to Islam in large numbers despite long periods of Muslim rule. During the Arabic conquest, Islam came to the Armenians; however, very few Armenians converted to Islam, since Christians were not required to convert by Muslim law.

There is, however, a minority of ethnic Armenian Muslims, known as Hamshenis, the vast majority of which live outside of Armenia mostly in Turkey and Russia.

Baháʼí Faith 

The Baháʼí Faith in Armenia begins with some involvements in the banishments and execution of the Báb, the Founder of Bábism, viewed by Baháʼís as a precursor religion. The same year of the execution of the Báb the religion was introduced into Armenia. During the period of Soviet policy of religious oppression, the Baháʼís in Armenia lost contact with the Baháʼís elsewhere. However, in 1963 communities were identified in Yerevan and Artez. Following Perestroika, the first Baháʼí Local Spiritual Assemblies of Armenia form in 1991 and Armenian Baháʼís elected their first National Spiritual Assembly in 1995. As of 2010, it was estimated that there were roughly 1,200 Baháʼís in Armenia.

Sects 
Since the early 1990s, foreign missionaries, esoteric and sectarian groups entered Armenia.

Hinduism

See also
Baháʼí Faith in Armenia
Catholic Church in Armenia
Christianity in Europe
Freedom of religion in Armenia
Hinduism in Armenia
History of the Jews in Armenia
Islam in Armenia
Religion by country
Religion in Europe
Yazidis in Armenia
Zoroastrianism in Armenia

References

Further reading
 Guroian, Vigen. "Armenia." In The Encyclopedia of Christianity, edited by Erwin Fahlbusch and Geoffrey William Bromiley, 125–126. Vol. 1. Grand Rapids: Wm. B. Eerdmans, 1999.

External links
Armenian Apostolic Orthodox Church Library
 Charles, Robia: "Religiosity in Armenia, Georgia and Azerbaijan" in the Caucasus Analytical Digest No. 20
 Harutyunyan, Harutyun: "The Role of the Armenian Church During Military Conflicts" in the Caucasus Analytical Digest No. 20

 
Armenia
Armenia